Ranjangaon Khurd  is a village in Rahata taluka of Ahmednagar district in the Indian state of Maharashtra.

Population
As per 2011 census, population of village is 4,783, of which 2,507 are males and 2,276 are females.

Economy
Main occupation of village is agriculture and allied work. Pd. Dr. Vitthalrao Vikhe Patil S.S.K. Ltd. (Shree Ganesh Unit), a sugar factory is located near a village.

Transport

Road
Village is located near Shirdi - Shani Shingnapur highway.

Rail
Chitali railway station is the nearest railway station to a village.

Air
Shirdi Airport is the nearest airport to a village.

See also
List of villages in Rahata taluka

References 

Villages in Ahmednagar district